Albion Township is a township in Barton County, Kansas, USA.  As of the 2000 census, its population was 63.

Albion Township was organized in 1879.

Geography
According to the USGS, it contains two cemeteries: Boyle and Olivet.

References
 USGS Geographic Names Information System (GNIS)

External links
 City-Data.com

Townships in Barton County, Kansas
Townships in Kansas